The 2020 European Figure Skating Championships were held in Graz, Austria, on 20–26 January 2020. Medals were awarded in the disciplines of men's singles, ladies' singles, pairs, and ice dance. The competition determined the entry quotas for each federation at the 2021 European Championships.

Qualification

Age and minimum TES requirements
The competition is open to skaters from all European member nations of the International Skating Union. The corresponding competition for non-European skaters is the 2020 Four Continents Figure Skating Championships.

Skaters are eligible for the 2020 European Championships if they turned 15 years of age before 1 July 2019 and have met the minimum technical elements score requirements. The ISU accepts scores if they were obtained at senior-level ISU-recognized international competitions at least 21 days before the first official practice day of the championships.

Number of entries per discipline 
Based on the results of the 2019 European Championships, each country can field one to three entries per discipline.

Entries 
Member nations began announcing their selections in December 2019. The International Skating Union published a complete list of entries on 3 January 2020.

Changes to preliminary assignments

Medal summary

Medalists
Medals awarded to the skaters who achieve the highest overall placements in each discipline:

Small medals awarded to the skaters who achieve the highest short program or rhythm dance placements in each discipline:

Medals awarded to the skaters who achieve the highest free skating or free dance placements in each discipline:

Medals by country 
Table of medals for overall placement:

Table of small medals for placement in the short/rhythm segment:

Table of small medals for placement in the free segment:

Records 

The following new ISU best scores were set during this competition:

Results

Men

Ladies

Pairs 

 Sofiia Nesterova / Artem Darenskyi were disqualified.

Ice dance

References 

European Figure Skating Championships
European Figure Skating Championships
International figure skating competitions hosted by Austria
European Figure
European Figure Skating Championships
Sport in Graz